Princess Sophie of Legnica (1525 – 6 February 1546) was wife and consort of the Elector of Brandenburg.

Early life 
Born into the House of Schlesien-Piast, she was the daughter of Frederick II, Duke of Legnica, Brzeg, and Wohlau, and his second wife, Sophie of Brandenburg-Ansbach-Kulmbach (1485 – 1537).

Biography 
Sophie, who was brought up as a Protestant, married the future Elector John George of Brandenburg on 15 February 1545. She died before he acceded to the Electorate and never reigned as Electress of Brandenburg. Her son (and only child) Joachim Frederick did, however, accede to the Electorate in 1598.

References 
 Daniel Martin Ernst Kirchner: The princesses and queens on the throne of the Hohenzollerns, 2nd Part: The last eight princesses, Berlin, 1867, p. 1-4.

1525 births
1546 deaths
Piast dynasty
Duchesses of Legnica
Electresses of Brandenburg